Edmond Vermeil (29 May 1878 – 14 April 1964) was a French academic. He was a specialist in the German culture.

He was born at Vevey, and brought up in the little village of Congénies in the south of France. He died, aged 85, in Paris.

1878 births
1964 deaths
Academic staff of the University of Strasbourg
People from Vevey